Rey Bouba is a city in North Region, Cameroon.

The Palace of Rey Bouba is located within the city.

See also
Communes of Cameroon

References

Populated places in North Region (Cameroon)